Paulo Jorge Carreira Nunes (born 16 June 1970), known as Paulo Jorge, is a Portuguese former footballer who played as a goalkeeper.

Club career
Paulo Jorge was born in Luanda, to Portuguese parents. During his career, he represented U.D. Leiria, AD Fafe, C.D. Feirense, S.C. Vila Real and Gil Vicente FC; having signed from the lower leagues into the second division in 1998, he contributed seven matches as the latter team promoted as champions.

For the next six Primeira Liga seasons, Paulo Jorge remained an undisputed starter, going on to make nearly 300 overall appearances for the Barcelos-based club and retiring at the age of 38 after a ten-year spell. At the end of the 2003–04 campaign, as Gil finished 12th, his displays earned him the Portuguese Goalkeeper of the Year award.

References

External links

1970 births
Living people
Angolan people of Portuguese descent
Footballers from Luanda
Portuguese footballers
Association football goalkeepers
Primeira Liga players
Liga Portugal 2 players
Segunda Divisão players
U.D. Leiria players
AD Fafe players
C.D. Feirense players
Gil Vicente F.C. players
Portuguese expatriates in Angola